Justin Rukas (February 4, 1910 – September 28, 1963) was an American football player. He was a prominent tackle and guard for the LSU Tigers football team. He graduated with a degree in geology. Rukas played professionally for the Brooklyn Dodgers of the National Football League (NFL) for one season.

References

1910 births
1963 deaths
LSU Tigers football players
Brooklyn Dodgers (NFL) players
American football guards
American football tackles